Frederick Martin Roulette (May 3, 1939 – December 24, 2022) was an American electric blues lap steel guitarist and singer. He was best known as an exponent of the lap steel guitar. He was a member of the band Daphne Blue and collaborated with Earl Hooker, Charlie Musselwhite, Henry Kaiser, and Harvey Mandel. He also released several solo albums. One commentator described Roulette as an "excellent musician".

A short documentary of Freddie Roulette appears on the video-sharing site YouTube that chronicles Roulette's time with the Daphne Blue Band. The online Blues encyclopedia, "All About Blues Music," describes Roulette's long tenure with the Daphne Blue Band and notes: "Freddie has also released an album, ‘Daphne Blue: Legendary Blues Instrumentals’ which contains 15 excellent tracks, which [Freddie] considers to be among his finest works."

Biography
Roulette's family was originally from New Orleans, but he was born and raised in Evanston, Illinois. He learned to play the steel guitar in high school. He started playing in clubs in Chicago in his teens, and in 1965 began work in Earl Hooker's backing band, touring and performing with him until 1969.

Hooker's band, with the pianist Pinetop Perkins, the harmonica player Carey Bell, the vocalist Andrew Odom, and Roulette, was "widely acclaimed" and "considered one of the best Earl had ever carried with him". Roulette performed on several of Hooker's singles; his 1967 album, The Genius of Earl Hooker; and the 1969 follow-up, 2 Bugs and a Roach.

Roulette later developed a friendship with Charlie Musselwhite and (credited as Fred Roulette) recorded with him on the 1969 album Chicago Blue Stars. He toured with Musselwhite and backed him on the albums Tennessee Woman and Memphis, Tennessee, before relocating to the San Francisco, California, area where he has lived ever since. He played there in a band with Luther Tucker and recorded with Earl Hooker's cousin John Lee Hooker.

After leaving Chicago for the San Francisco Bay area, Roulette began "teaming up with the 14-year-old guitarist Ray Bronner ('Daphne Blue Ray'), and some veterans from Chicago in the band Daphne Blue, Freddie was often joined by ‘Big Moose’ (Johnny Walker), ‘Pinetop Perkins’ and Clarence ‘Gatemouth’ Brown at gigs and on record." "Freddie released an album, Daphne Blue: Legendary Blues Instrumentals, which contains 15 excellent tracks, which he considers to be among his finest works."

In 1973, Roulette released his debut solo album, Sweet Funky Steel, which was produced by the guitarist Harvey Mandel. Don "Sugarcane" Harris played on several tracks. Over the next twenty years, Roulette continued to perform with other musicians and occasionally led his own band, while also working full-time as an apartment manager. On the 1996 album Psychedelic Guitar Circus, he worked in a group with Mandel, Kaiser and Steve Kimock.  Grammy nominee, producer/composer Larry Hoffman brought Freddie to Chicago where the artist recorded his 1997 solo album, Back in Chicago: Jammin' with Willie Kent and the Gents, with Willie Kent and Chico Banks, on Hi Horse Records. The album won an award from Living Blues magazine as Best Blues Album of 1997. Following that album's success, Roulette began performing widely at blues festivals and  recorded the 1998 album Spirit of Steel, featuring the Holmes Brothers and produced by Kaiser. He also contributed to Kaiser's album Yo Miles, a tribute to Miles Davis.

Roulette's solo album Man of Steel (2006) featured guitar playing by Will Bernard and David Lindley; Kaiser also played guitar and produced the album. It was recorded in Fantasy Studios, in Berkeley, California, and included strains of jazz, country, soul and reggae in the overall blues setting. In the same year, Roulette played locally in a small combo including Mike Hinton.

Roulette played at numerous music festivals over the years, including the Long Beach Blues Festival, the San Francisco Blues Festival (1979), and the Calgary Folk Music Festival (2000). He continued to play club dates in the San Francisco area, often with Mandel. In 2012, Jammin' With Friends was recorded at three separate studios with various musicians. It was produced by Michael Borbridge, who also played drums on all the tracks.

As of 2015, Roulette was still playing with the Daphne Blue Band.

In February 2019, the Chicago Reader published an article on Roulette and his band members, along with sound clips, titled: "The Secret History of Chicago Music: Pivotal Musicians That Somehow Haven't Gotten Their Just Dues."

Roulette died on December 24, 2022, at the age of 83.

Discography

See also
List of electric blues musicians

References

External links
Freddie Roulette Interview, NAMM Oral History Library (2016)
 

1939 births
2022 deaths
American blues guitarists
American male guitarists
Chicago blues musicians
Electric blues musicians
American session musicians
Slide guitarists
Steel guitarists
Musicians from Evanston, Illinois
African-American guitarists
Blues musicians from Illinois
Guitarists from Illinois
20th-century American guitarists
20th-century American male musicians
20th-century African-American musicians
21st-century African-American people